Ministry of Foreign Affairs of North Macedonia is a government department in North Macedonia. Bujar Osmani serves as the current Minister of Foreign Affairs, since 31 August 2020.

List of ministers

See also 
 Politics of North Macedonia

References 

Government agencies of North Macedonia
Government of North Macedonia